In the US state of Texas science is one of several academic events sanctioned by the University Interscholastic League.  It is also a competition held by the Texas Math and Science Coaches Association, using the same rules as the UIL.

Science is designed to test students' knowledge of scientific fact, understanding of scientific principles and the ability to think through scientific problems.

Eligibility
Students in Grade 7 through Grade 12 are eligible to enter this event.  Students in Grade 6 may compete with permission of the district executive committee, but can only compete in each junior high division (see below) only one time throughout their academic career.

For competition purposes, Grades 7 and 8 compete in separate divisions (Division I for Grade 7 and Division II for Grade 8) while Grades 9-12 compete together, with separate subjects covered on each test as follows:
The test for Grades 6-8 covers matter and energy, equilibrium, force and motion, physical and chemical properties, the relationship between organisms and the environment, the components of our solar system, and the composition of matter and genetics.
The test for Grades 9-12 covers biology, chemistry, and physics, with 20 questions in each general field (though physics and chemistry often overlap).

Each school may send up to three students for each junior high division.  In order for a school to participate in team competition, the school must send three students.

For Grades 9-12 each school may send up to six students; students qualify for the next level if they are on the winning team, score in the top three individuals at a meet, or place first in biology, chemistry, or physics.  In order for a school to participate in team competition, the school must send at least three students. Team scores are found by adding the scores of the top 3 individuals from a school.

Rules and Scoring
As the format and rules differ significantly for the junior high and high school levels, each is discussed separately below.

Junior High Level
The test consists of 50 questions, which must be completed in 45 minutes.  A time warning is given at 30 minutes.  At the stop signal, incomplete answers cannot be completed.  Calculators are not allowed.

The questions may be answered in any order; there is no penalty for skipping questions.

Scoring is five points for each correct answer, and two points deducted for each incorrect answer.  Unanswered questions are not scored.

High School Level
At the high school level, the test consists of 60 questions, which must be completed in two hours.  The first 20 questions involve biology, the second twenty questions involve chemistry, and the final twenty questions involve physics.  No time warning is given, except that tests cannot be turned in until the proctor announces that 30 minutes have passed.

The questions may be answered in any order; there is no penalty for skipping questions.

Questions must be answered to the proper number of significant digits, with "small variation" in the final significant digit acceptable.

The test booklet includes a periodic table of the elements, including atomic weights and atomic numbers, plus other scientific relationships, such as the vacuum speed of light or the gravitational constant, which may be used by the student.

Scratch paper is allowed in the contest, and notations may be made anywhere except on the answer sheet.  Students may bring one calculator plus one spare, so long as it does not need external power.  Hand-held computers are not allowed, nor are any calculators with factory-installed memory or with the ability to accept memory cards or memory sticks.

Scoring is six points for each correct answer, and two points deducted for each incorrect answer.  Unanswered questions are not scored.  In addition to the total score, each subsection (biology, chemistry, and physics) is scored separately.

Determining the Winner

Junior High
Scoring is posted for only the top six individual places and the top three teams.

There are no tiebreakers for either individual or team competition.

High School Level
The top three individuals and the top team (determined based on the scores of the top three individuals) will advance to the next round.  In addition, within each region, the highest-scoring second place team from all district competitions advances as the "wild card" to regional competition (provided the team has four members), and within the state, the highest-scoring second place team from all regional competitions advances as the wild card to the state competition.  Members of advancing teams who did not place individually remain eligible to compete for individual awards at higher levels.  Furthermore, the individuals with the top score in each subsection will also advance even if the individual was not one of the top three overall scorers or the top team.

For individual competition (overall and for each subsection), the tiebreaker is percent accuracy (number of problems answered correctly divided by number of problems attempted, defined as any question with a mark or erasure in the answer blank).  In the event a tie remains, all remaining individuals will advance.

For team competition, the score of the fourth-place individual is used as the tiebreaker.  If a team has only three members it is not eligible to participate in the tiebreaker.  If the fourth-place score still results in a tie, the individual tiebreaker rules will not apply, and all remaining tied teams will advance.  At the state level ties for first place are not broken.

For district meet academic championship and district meet sweepstakes awards, points are awarded to the school as follows:
Individual places:
Overall score: 1st--15, 2nd--12, 3rd--10, 4th--8, 5th--6, and 6th--4.
In addition, the school with the top scorer in a subsection receives 3 points.  A school can earn multiple subsection points even if the same student is the top scorer in two, or all three, of the subsections.
Team places: 1st--10 and 2nd--5.
The maximum number of points a school can earn in Science is 42.

The student with the most wins in the history of the competition is Kieran Fitzgerald from Friendswood High School, who achieved the highest score in any division three years in a row: 2003-2004, 2004-2005, and 2005-2006.

List of prior winners

Individual (Overall)
NOTE: For privacy reasons, only the winning school is shown.  The 1958-59 winner was an "all schools" winner; beginning with the 1959-60 academic year winners were held in all five classifications. The classifications were renumbered in 1980-81, with Class B becoming Class A and the other classes adding one letter (thus, Class A became Class AA, and so forth).

Individual (Biology)
NOTE: For privacy reasons, only the winning school is shown.  The UIL did not score individual subsections until the 1985-86 scholastic year.

Individual (Chemistry)
NOTE: For privacy reasons, only the winning school is shown.  The UIL did not score individual subsections until the 1985-86 scholastic year.

Individual (Physics)
NOTE: For privacy reasons, only the winning school is shown.  The UIL did not score individual subsections until the 1985-86 scholastic year.

Team
NOTE: UIL did not recognize a team championship in this event until the 1990-91 scholastic year.

References

External links
Official UIL Rules for Science--High School Level
Official UIL Rules for Science--Junior High Level NOTE: This file contains rules for other competitions; Section 1466 contains the rules applicable to Science.

University Interscholastic League